The Svid is a river in Kargopolsky District in the south-west of Arkhangelsk Oblast in Russia. It connects Lake Vozhe and Lake Lacha and belongs to the river basin of the Onega.

The Svid is part of a major waterway from the Vozhega via Lakes Vozhe and Lacha to the Onega River, one of the biggest river basins of the White Sea.

Its source is the Lake Vozhe at the border of Vologda Oblast. The Svid flows from Lake Vozhe to the north, through a very sparsely populated landscape. In the middle part of the river the banks becomes more rocky, and the river forms many small rapids. In its lower reaches the river slows again, and the bank becomes low and marshy. The Svid empties into the southern end of Lake Lacha, which drains through the Onega towards the White Sea. 

The Svid below the rapids (downstream from the village of Gorka) is navigable, though there is no regular passenger navigation.

References

Rivers of Arkhangelsk Oblast